Lugalshaengur (Lugal-sha-engur), (c. 2600 BCE), was ensi (governor) of the Sumerian city-state of Lagash.

The First dynasty of Lagash is dated to the 25th century BCE. Lugalshaengur wastributary to Mesilim. Following the hegemony of Mesannepada of Ur, Ur-Nanshe succeeded Lugalshaengur as the new high priest of Lagash and achieved independence, making himself king. He defeated Ur and captured the king of Umma, Pabilgaltuk.

Lugalshaengur is known by an inscription on the head of a mace dedicated by King Mesilim of Kish, who was therefore contemporary with him.

See also

History of Sumer

References

Bibliography 
 Vojtech Zamarovský, Na počiatku bol Sumer, Mladé letá, 1968 Bratislava
 Plamen Rusev,  Mesalim, Lugal Na Kish: Politicheska Istoriia Na Ranen Shumer (XXVIII-XXVI V. Pr. N. E.),  Faber, 2001 (LanguageBulgarian)   [(Mesalim, Lugal of Kish. Political History of Early Sumer (XXVIII–XXVI century BC.)]

Kings of Lagash
25th-century BC Sumerian kings